Bangalore Days is a 2014 Indian Malayalam-language coming of age romantic comedy-drama film written and directed by Anjali Menon, and co-produced by Anwar Rasheed and Sophia Paul under the banner Anwar Rasheed Entertainments and Weekend Blockbusters. The film features an ensemble cast consisting of Dulquer Salmaan, Nivin Pauly, Fahadh Faasil, Nazriya Nazim, Parvathy Thiruvothu, Isha Talwar and Paris Laxmi. Nithya Menen appears in a cameo. The plot revolves around three cousins from Kerala who move to Bangalore, continuing Menon's trend of films about family relationships. The film released on 30 May 2014 in 205 theatres, making it one of the biggest release for a Malayalam film, simultaneously all over India and received positive reviews.

The film received three Kerala State Film Awards including Best Actor and Best Actress awards for Nivin Pauly and Nazriya Nazim respectively, and Best Screenplay for Anjali Menon, while Parvathy Thiruvothu went to win Filmfare Award for Best Supporting Actress and Anjali Menon winning the Filmfare Award for Best Director. The film is later remade in Tamil as Bangalore Naatkal (2016). The movie is considered to be one of the best Malayalam movies made during the New-Gen cinema movement in Malayalam.

Plot
The story revolves around three cousins, Divya Prakash aka 'Kunju', Krishnan P.P. aka 'Kuttan' and Arjun aka 'Aju', who have shared a close bond since their childhood. Aju, whose parents are divorced, is a bike mechanic who lives life on his own terms. Kuttan is a software engineer whose heart and soul is back home in his village. Kunju has completed her graduation and aspires to do her MBA from IIM, but is compelled to marry the workaholic corporate executive Shivadas aka 'Das' because of her parents' astrologer's suggestions. After their wedding, Divya moves to Bangalore as Das is settled there. Kuttan does the same for his job, while Aju joins a biker gang as a mechanic in the same city.

Kunju feels emotionally alone as Das continues to ignore her. Her only solace is the time she gets to spend with her cousins. Naive Kuttan, who wants a traditional, modest, saree-clad girl for a wife, falls in love with air hostess Meenakshi on the Bangalore-Kochi flight. They date, and Kuttan changes from a reserved and shy person to a trendy person to impress her, but his dreams are shattered when her ex-boyfriend arrives at her flat and he realizes that she was only trying to get back with him. He breaks off his relationship with her.

Kunju and Das's personal life keeps falling into despair. After an argument, one day, Kunju, upon inspecting a room in their apartment that Das never lets anyone enter, is shocked to find it filled with photos, knickknacks, and possessions of a strange girl. In horror of not having a place in Das's heart and life, she leaves him and returns home to Kerala in sorrow, with Kuttan. There they are still pulled into despair as Kuttan's father has abandoned his rich family and gone for a permanent pilgrimage, willing all his wealth and its rights to Kuttan and his sister. Kuttan has to bring his mother to Bangalore, after she convinces him to.

Aju was a bike racer, but due to a foul incident, he is forced to serve a year's ban from racing. He falls for a radio jockey named Sarah, but when he finally meets her in person, he finds that she is a paraplegic. He begins to like her attitude and follows her. They become good friends, but Aju is saddened when he learns that Sarah is to leave for Australia on a university scholarship.

Meanwhile, as Kunju and Das are in the middle of getting a divorce, Aju learns that a few years back, Das was a former bike racer. He then went by the name Shiva and was the leader of his biking gang. Shiva had given up on racing after he was involved in an accident that killed his love Natasha Francis. Upon knowing what happened, Kunju decides to return to Bangalore and works towards her MBA. She gradually wins over a repentant Das and soon arranges for him to meet Natasha's parents. After the meeting, Das is able to let go of his past. Kunju forgives him and they get their marital life on track.

Kuttan's mother gets to know about the urban Indian culture with her neighbors, and after three months, decides to visit her daughter in Oklahoma. In the airport, Kuttan and his mother see Meenakshi, who will be an air hostess in Kuttan's mother's flight to America. Meenakshi approaches Kuttan and reveals that her relationship with the old boyfriend has broken permanently, and she will be waiting for his call. Just seconds after that, Kuttan goes by and talks with her, telling her to leave him.

Aju gets a chance to race on the same day that Sarah has to leave for Australia. With Kunju, Kuttan, and Das cheering for him, he wins the race. After the race, Aju realizes how important Sarah is to him and that meeting her changed his life. He asks her not to leave for Australia. Sarah forgoes her scholarship to stay with Aju in Bangalore. In the end, Kuttan marries his neighbor in Bangalore, a foreigner named Michelle, a European Bharathanatyam dancer who has embraced the culture of India. The film ends with Kunju, Das, Aju, and Sarah breaking into their room and all of them posing for a photo.

Cast

Production

Development 
After the success of Manjadikuru and Ustad Hotel, Anjali Menon announced her new project named L for Love, and said it will be produced by Anwar Rasheed and Sophia Paul in later Anjali clarified that the film was titled Bangalore Days. Anjali described the film as simple at its core, about people we all know, about dreams, relationships, love and how our environment can transform us and yet within. In a conversation to a leading newspaper, Anjali said that most of the film would be shot completely in Bangalore, the City of Garden, as the story demands it and the film will features bunch of youngsters who have migrated to Bangalore for work and their lives in the city. The film was again from the friendship of Anjali and Anwar Rasheed shared when they worked together in the previous films. Menon announced that the film features new actors and actress of Malayalam cinema including Nivin Pauly, Dulquer Salmaan, Nazriya Nazim and Fahadh Faasil. Rafeeq Ahmed, Santhosh Varma and Anna Katharina Valayil wrote the lyrics while Gopi Sunder signed to compose the music of the film. Cinematography was handled by Sameer Thahir and editing was given to Praveen Prabhakar. The first look trailer of the film was released online on 7 May 2014, followed by a subtitled version on 12 May. Anjali selected Nazriya, Dulquer and Nivin which will be perfect and fit for the role of three cousins. Fahadh was later selected to do his character. Maniyanpilla Raju, Praveena, Vijayaraghavan, Kalpana and Vivas were signed for supporting roles.

Filming 
Filming of Bangalore Days started in December 2013. The filming was wrapped in March 2014 and completed shooting in 70 days. The song "Ethu Kari Raavilum" was shot in Mysore and some of the scenes in Sankey.

Music

The soundtrack features five songs composed by Gopi Sunder. He was sued for copyright violation by Bryan Adams on the basis that the song "Nam Ooru Bengaluru" bore a strong resemblance to Adams' song "Summer of '69". 
The track "Ente Kannil Ninakkai" seems to be based on Carla Bruni's song, Quelqu'un m'a dit from her album of the same name. The track "Ente Kannil Ninakkai" also seems to be based on John Mayer's song, Edge of Desire from his album Battle Studies (album).
The lyrics were written by Rafeeq Ahmed, Santhosh Varma and Anna Katharina Valayil.

 Track list

Release
The film was originally scheduled for release on 9 May 2014, but was rescheduled due to delays in production. The film released on 30 May 2014 in 205 theatres, making it one of the biggest release for a Malayalam film, simultaneously all over India. At the time of release, Bangalore Days was the Malayalam film to have a subtitled release in maximum number of screens. The movie released with English subtitles, in more than 200 screens across India. The film released in UAE on 3 July 2014.

Bangalore Days was distributed in India by A & A Release through August Cinema. Star Movie was the distributor in the United States, Indian Movies in United Kingdom and Tricolor Entertainments in Australia, New Zealand, Malaysia, Singapore and Japan.

Reception

Critical reception
The film received positive reviews from critics, with praise towards the direction, performances, music and cinematography. Veeyen of Nowrunning.com stated that "Bangalore Days is a buoyant examination of love, the basest of all human emotions and the bonds and bondages that it leaves in its wake. Pungently played out in the metro city of Bangalore, it's a stunning reminder of a spectacular marvel that unravels before us every day — a marvel called life." The reviewer of Sify.com gave the verdict as "Good" and said, "Bangalore Days is a young, vibrant film that is colourful and peppy."  Krishnanunni U. of Oneindia.in rated the film 4 in a scale of 5 and described it as a "perfect youth entertainer." Aswin J Kumar of The Times of India wrote, "Bangalore Days might not be charming as a whole, still Anjali shows intent in knitting together family bonds in purely comic vein, throwing up characters like a wife and husband who just drift apart from each other out of love for independent life. This is a film that talks cheerfully about love and hope," and rated the film 3.5 in a scale of 5. Paresh C Palicha of Rediff.com wrote, "The first feature film Anjali Menon directed was Manjadikuru where children get a perplexed view of the adult world. Bangalore Days can be seen as an extension of that, where those children are grown up but still want to hold on to their childhood." He gave the film 3 out of 5 stars.

Box office
The film collected  in its first week. The film grossed £100,670 (₹ 1.03 crore) within 1 month, and $180,217 (₹ 1.34 crore) in its final run from the UK box office.

The film's total gross collection was about ₹48 - 50 crore worldwide, making it the highest grossing Malayalam film of the year and one of the highest grossing Malayalam films of all time. The film ran for a hundred days in four centres in Chennai and two months in Hyderabad.

Awards and nominations

Remakes
The remake rights of the film, for Tamil, Telugu and Hindi languages, was jointly acquired by Dil Raju and PVP Cinemas.
The Tamil version of this film, titled Bangalore Naatkal was released on 5 February 2016. The film is directed by Bhaskar and produced by Prasad V. Potluri under the production companies PVP Cinema and Bommarillu Bhaskar Cinema. The film stars Sri Divya, Bobby Simha, Arya, Rana Daggubati, Raai Laxmi, Parvathy Thiruvothu, Paris Laxmi and Prakash Raj in starring roles with Samantha Ruth Prabhu appears in a cameo appearance.

Notes

References

External links
 

2014 romantic comedy-drama films
2014 films
2010s Malayalam-language films
Malayalam films remade in other languages
Indian romantic comedy-drama films
Films scored by Gopi Sundar
Films shot in Bangalore
Films set in Bangalore
2014 comedy films
2014 drama films
Films directed by Anjali Menon